The Ulch language, or Olcha, is a Tungusic language spoken by the Ulch people in the Russian Far East.

Phonology

Vowels 

 Vowel length is also distributed.

Consonants 

 [f] is a rare sound in native words.
 /β ɡ/ have allophones of [w ɣ].
 /k x/ can become uvularized as [q χ] before vowels /a o/.

Alphabet 

In brackets are letters that are used in writing, though not officially included in the alphabet.

References

Bibliography 

Sunik, O. P. (1985). Ul'chskij jazyk: issledovanija i materialy. Leningrad: Nauka, Leningradskoe Otdelenie. 262pp.

External links 
 ELAR archive of Endangered Tungusic languages of Khabarovskij Kraj (including Ulcha)

Agglutinative languages
Critically endangered languages
Languages of Russia
Tungusic languages